Maccabi Ra'anana is a professional basketball club that is based in Ra'anana, Israel. The club plays in the Israeli National League, the second-tier division league of Israel.

History
Maccabi Ra'anana was founded in 1980. The team won the Israeli 2nd Division championship of the 1995–96 season. The club then competed in Israel's top-level Israeli Super League, for the first time, in the following 1996–97 season. 

Maccabi Ra'anana competed in the European-wide secondary level FIBA Saporta Cup, in the 1999–00 season. They also finished as the runner-up of the Israeli Super League in the 1999–00 season. After that, the team subsequently competed in one of the two top-level European-wide competitions at that time, the FIBA SuproLeague, in the following 2000–01 season. In the 2001–02 season, they competed in the Pan-European third level competition, the FIBA Korac Cup. 

In 2002, due to financial problems, the club merged with Hapoel Herzliya, which was then re-named to Bnei Hasharon. In 2011, the merger of the two clubs ended, and from that point, the club again competed under its original Maccabi Ra'anana name. Maccabi Ra'anana won the Israeli Basketball Association Cup (Israel's 2nd Division Cup), in the 2011–12 season.

In 2022, Maccabi Ra'anana made a preseason tour through the United States, facing three National Basketball Association (NBA) teams: the Los Angeles Clippers, Portland Trail Blazers and the Oklahoma City Thunder, losing all three games.

Titles and honors

Domestic competitions
Israeli Championship
 Runners-up (1): 2000

Lower division competitions
Israeli 2nd Division
 Champions (1): 1996

Association Cup
 Winners (1): 2012

Players

Current roster

Notable former players
- Set a club record or won an individual award as a professional player.
- Played at least one official international match for his senior national team at any time.
  Dror Cohen
Austin Price (born 1995), American

Games against NBA teams

References

External links
Eurobasket.com Team Profile

Basketball teams established in 1980
Basketball teams in Israel